Hopea centipeda is a tree in the family Dipterocarpaceae, native to Borneo. The specific epithet centipeda means "hundred feet", referring to the stilt roots.

Description
The bark is smooth.

Distribution and habitat
Hopea centipeda is endemic to Borneo.

Conservation
Hopea centipeda has been assessed as endangered on the IUCN Red List. It is threatened by land conversion for plantations and by logging for its timber. The species is found in some protected areas.

References

centipeda
Endemic flora of Borneo
Plants described in 1967
Taxonomy articles created by Polbot